Augusto Fernández Guerra (born 23 September 1997) is a Spanish motorcycle racer who currently competes in the 2022 Moto2 World Championship, for the Red Bull KTM Ajo team. He is not related to MotoGP rider Raúl Fernández, and not related to Raul’s younger brother Moto3 rider Adrián Fernández. He will compete for Tech3 GasGas Factory Racing in the 2023 MotoGP World Championship.

Career

Moto2 World Championship

Speed Up Racing (2017)
He made his Grand Prix debut at the 2017 Italian Grand Prix replacing Axel Bassani in the Speed Up team. He remained with the team until the end of the season, scoring six points in total.

Pons Racing (2018–2019)
He started the 2018 season in the Moto2 European Championship but was called up to Grand Prix competition when Héctor Barberá was fired from Pons Racing due to driving under influence. He replaced Barberá well, scoring points in his first four races, and improving over the season, ending his campaign with a 6th place in Motegi, a 4th place in Australia, and an 8th place in Valencia. Fernández finished the season 18th in the standings with 45 points, 35 points more than Barberá.

He started the 2019 Moto2 World Championship with a 5th place in Qatar, before a double wrist fracture, suffered in a heavy crash in Argentina's Saturday practice session, caused him to miss the next two races. He would return from his injury with his maiden podium in Moto2 at Jerez, and repeat it with another third place, the very next weekend in Le Mans. A 5th place in Mugello was followed by his first Pole Position in the category in Barcelona, and though he only finished the race in 4th, two weeks later in Assen, Fernández would clinch his first victory in the Moto2 category, following Álex Márquez and Lorenzo Baldassarri crashing out of the lead together. He would win two more races in Britain and Misano, ending the season 5th in the championship standings, with 207 points.

Marc VDS Racing Team (2020–2021)
For the 2020 season, Fernández was given the seat of the outgoing Álex Márquez at Marc VDS Racing, partnering Sam Lowes. It would be a bit of a down year for him, failing to stand on the podium during the season, his highest finish being a 4th place in France. He ended the season 13th in the standings, with 71 points.

The 2021 Moto2 World Championship would see Fernández bounce back, despite starting the year poorly, including four retirements in the first eight races of the season. He finished 3rd in Assen, Spielberg, Austria, and Aragón, 2nd in Rimini, and then 3rd again in the season closer in Valencia, making it six podiums in the last ten races for Fernández. He finished 5th in the standings with 174 points.

Red Bull KTM Ajo (2022)
He was signed by the Red Bull KTM Ajo for the 2022 season.

MotoGP World Championship

Tech3 GasGas Factory Racing (from 2023) 
Fernández will graduate to MotoGP for the 2023 season and race for Tech3 GasGas Factory Racing, alongside Pol Espargaró.

Career statistics

Grand Prix motorcycle racing

By season

By class

Races by year
(Races in bold indicate pole position, races in italics indicate fastest lap)

 Half points awarded as less than two thirds of the race distance (but at least three full laps) was completed.

References

External links

 
 

1997 births
Living people
Spanish motorcycle racers
Moto2 World Championship riders
Sportspeople from Madrid
Moto2 World Riders' Champions